Cantril is a city in Van Buren County, Iowa, United States. The population was 224 at the 2020 census.

History
Cantril was laid out in 1871.

Geography
Cantril is located at  (40.643546, -92.067248).

Demographics

2010 census
As of the census of 2010, there were 222 people, 104 households, and 59 families residing in the city. The racial makeup of the city was 98.6% White, 0.5% Asian, 0.5% Pacific Islander, and 0.5% from other races. Hispanic or Latino of any race were 0.5% of the population.

There were 104 households, of which 22.1% had children under the age of 18 living with them, 45.2% were married couples living together, 6.7% had a female householder with no husband present, 4.8% had a male householder with no wife present, and 43.3% were non-families. 40.4% of all households were made up of individuals, and 25% had someone living alone who was 65 years of age or older. The average household size was 2.13 and the average family size was 2.92.

The median age in the city was 49 years. 21.6% of residents were under the age of 18; 5.5% were between the ages of 18 and 24; 19.9% were from 25 to 44; 26.2% were from 45 to 64; and 27% were 65 years of age or older. The gender makeup of the city was 51.4% male and 48.6% female.

2000 census
As of the census of 2000, there were 257 people, 112 households, and 71 families residing in the city. The racial makeup of the city was 96.89% White, 0.39% African American, 0.78% Native American, 0.78% Asian, 0.39% from other races, and 0.78% from two or more races. Hispanic or Latino of any race were 0.39% of the population.

There were 112 households, out of which 25.9% had children under the age of 18 living with them, 52.7% were married couples living together, 6.3% had a female householder with no husband present, and 36.6% were non-families. 32.1% of all households were made up of individuals, and 23.2% had someone living alone who was 65 years of age or older. The average household size was 2.29 and the average family size was 2.90.

In the city, the population was spread out, with 24.5% under the age of 18, 8.2% from 18 to 24, 20.6% from 25 to 44, 23.7% from 45 to 64, and 23.0% who were 65 years of age or older. The median age was 41 years. For every 100 females, there were 112.4 males. For every 100 females age 18 and over, there were 96.0 males.

The median income for a household in the city was $22,917, and the median income for a family was $25,625. Males had a median income of $27,778 versus $19,000 for females. The per capita income for the city was $12,488. About 21.7% of families and 22.0% of the population were below the poverty line, including 35.7% of those under the age of eighteen and 17.5% of those 65 or over.

Education
The community is served by the Van Buren County Community School District. 

Cantril was previously in the Fox Valley Community School District. Initially the district had two schools: Cantril Elementary School in Cantril and Fox Valley Jr./Sr. High School in Milton, although after Fox Valley grade-sharing arrangement with Van Buren Schools in which it sent secondary students to Van Buren Junior/Senior High School in Keosauqua, the former high school closed, and the elementary and district headquarters moved to Milton. The Fox Valley school district consolidated into the Van Buren Community School District effective July 1, 2004. That district in turn merged into Van Buren County CSD on July 1, 2019.

References

Cities in Iowa
Cities in Van Buren County, Iowa